The Sublî is a religious folk dance of the Tagalog ethno-linguistic group in the Philippines. It is mostly confined to several towns in the province of Batangas.

Description
The dance is considered a favourite in the barangays of Bauan and Alitagtag, Batangas, as well as other parts of that province in the southwestern part of Luzon. It is a Catholic devotional practice (often described as a "prayer") honouring the Holy Cross of Alitagtag (Tagalog: Mahál na Poóng Santa Krus) traditionally done in May, the month in which Roodmas fell before the General Roman Calendar was revised by Pope John XXIII in 1960.

The name Sublî is a portmanteau of the Tagalog words subsób ("bent", "stooped", also "fall on the face") and balî (also "bent" or "broken"), referring to the posture adopted by male dancers. Both men and women dancers—called manunublî (meaning "them that Sublî")—perform in pairs and various formations. The women's costume includes a straw hat adorned with ribbons, which are waved about, removed, tipped in salute to a copy of the Cross of Alitagtag set on an altar, or used to make other graceful gestures.

Theatrical versions (often performed outside of a devotional context) are set to a rondalla ensemble playing a tune by Juan P. Silos, but in its older form the dance is accompanied only by the constant beating of drums, punctuated by the clacking of wooden castanets used by the men. The frenetic rhythm of the drums is also seen as proof of the custom's pre-Hispanic origins, in line with the theory that it is a Christianised version of much older, animist rites. A chant to the Holy Cross is sometimes intoned at the beginning of the Sublî, underscoring the dance's originally religious character.

External links
 Version found in Agoncillo
 Version found in Sinala

Culture of Batangas
Dances of the Philippines
Philippine folk culture
Religion in the Philippines